Sofia Mestari (born 1980) is a French singer of Moroccan origin, at the age of ten she moved to Paris with her family. Mestari represented France in the Eurovision Song Contest 2000 in Stockholm with the song On aura le ciel, which placed 23rd out of 24 with 5 points. She released an album of the same name, with two singles, "On aura le ciel" and "Derrière les voiles", and 2003 saw the release of a new album En plein coeur de la nuit and featured the single "Ne pars pas". "Ne pars pas" spent 23 weeks on the French Singles Chart and peaked at 27. Sofia's third album, entitled La vie en entier was released on 16 June 2008.

References

External links
Official Myspace

French people of Moroccan descent
Eurovision Song Contest entrants for France
Eurovision Song Contest entrants of 2000
1980 births
Living people
21st-century French singers
21st-century French women singers